Men in Black: The Album is the soundtrack to the film Men in Black. It was released on July 1, 1997, distributed by Columbia Records and featured production from some of music's top producers, such as Poke & Tone, Jermaine Dupri and The Ummah.

The album was a huge success, spending two consecutive weeks at  1 on the Billboard 200, as well as peaking at  2 on the Top R&B/Hip-Hop Albums and  3 on the Canadian Albums Chart. The RIAA certified the album 3× Platinum for shipments of over 3,000,000 copies in the United States.

Four singles were released from the album, Will Smith's "Men in Black" and "Just Cruisin'", Nas's 
"Escobar '97" and Jermaine Dupri and Snoop Dogg's "We Just Wanna Party with You". Except for the title song and the two Danny Elfman cues, none of the tracks on the album are in the film.

This soundtrack also marked the debuts of then-unknowns Alicia Keys and Destiny's Child.

Track listing

Sample Credits
"Men in Black" features a sample from "Forget Me Nots" by Patrice Rushen written by Patrice Rushen, Terry McFadden and Fred Washington
"We Just Wanna Party with You" contains portions of "Get Down On It" by Kool & the Gang written by Robert Bell, James Taylor, George Brown, Ronald Bell, Claydes Smith, Robert Mickens and E. Deodato
"Just Cruisin'" contains a sample of "I'm Back For More" by Al Johnson written by Kenneth Stover
"The 'Notic" contains replayed elements of "Shining Star" by Earth, Wind & Fire written by Larry Dunn, Maurice White and Philip Bailey
"Escobar '97" contains a sample of "I'll Move You No Mountain" by The Love Unlimited Orchestra written by Jerry Ragovoy and Aaron Schroeder
"Same Ol' Thing" contains a sample of "Miles Beyond" by The Mahavishnu Orchestra written by J. McLaughlin

Men In Black: The Score
Columbia Records released a Danny Elfman score album, including the two tracks included on Men In Black: The Album, on December 1, 1997.

 M.I.B. Main Theme (2:58)
 D's Memories/Chase (3:57)
 Edgar's Truck/A New Man (2:58)
 Imports/Quiet Moment (2:22)
 J Contemplates (1:18)
 Headquarters (1:13)
 The Suit (1:28)
 Morgue Time (:49)
 Petit Mort (1:42)
 K Reminisces (:48)
 Orion's Belt/Cat Stinger (2:18)
 Noisy Cricket/Impending Trouble (2:08)
 Sexy Morgue Babe/Icon (5:41)
 Take Off/Crash (7:20)
 Finale (3:02)
 M.I.B. Closing Theme (2:36)

Charts

Weekly charts

Year-end charts

Certifications and sales

References

Albums produced by Jermaine Dupri
Hip hop soundtracks
1997 soundtrack albums
Columbia Records soundtracks
Rhythm and blues soundtracks
Men in Black (franchise)
Albums produced by Cory Rooney
Albums produced by Q-Tip (musician)
Action film soundtracks
Comedy film soundtracks
Science fiction film soundtracks